Phyllodromia melanocephala is a species of fly in the family Empididae. It is found in the  Palearctic .

References

External links
Images representing Phyllodromia melanocephala at BOLD

Empididae
Insects described in 1794
Asilomorph flies of Europe